Uuemõisa may refer to several places in Estonia:

Uuemõisa (borough), small borough in Haapsalu municipality, Lääne County
Uuemõisa village, Lääne County, village in Haapsalu municipality, Lääne County
Uuemõisa, Lääne-Viru County, village in Väike-Maarja Parish, Lääne-Viru County
Uuemõisa, Saare County, village in Saareamaa Parish, Saare County

See also
Kose-Uuemõisa, small borough in Kose Parish, Harju County